Remi Joseph Callens (born 20 March 1894, date of death unknown) was a Belgian freestyle swimmer and diver. He competed at the 1920 Summer Olympics in the 3 meter springboard and at the 1924 Summer Olympics in the  freestyle relay, but failed to reach the finals.

References

1894 births
Date of death unknown
Belgian male freestyle swimmers
Divers at the 1920 Summer Olympics
Swimmers at the 1924 Summer Olympics
Belgian male divers
Olympic swimmers of Belgium
Olympic divers of Belgium
Place of birth missing
20th-century Belgian people